NTPL Thermal Power Station is a 1000 MW (2×500 MW) coal-based thermal plant in the Tuticorin District of Tamil Nadu. The project is a joint venture of TANGEDCO and NLC India Limited. The units were commissioned in March and April 2015, respectively.

References

Coal-fired power stations in Tamil Nadu
Thoothukudi district
Energy infrastructure completed in 2015
2015 establishments in Tamil Nadu